Henry Stuckey (born July 24, 1950) is a former American football defensive back. He played two seasons with the New York Giants (1975–1976), after three seasons with the Miami Dolphins (1972–1974), where he was part of the team that won Super Bowl VIII. An eighth-round selection in the 1972 NFL Draft, he did not play his first year with the Dolphins, but then had to replace an injured Lloyd Mumphord in 1973. Stuckey replaced Mumphord in Super Bowl Vll on special teams. He recorded his first NFL tackle when he tackled Washington Redskins kick returner Herb Mul-Key during the start of the second half kick off. Although the NFL does not recognize it the video clearly shows the special teams tackle.
Stuckey reunited with one of his close teammates, Charlie Leigh, in 2002 to do a player day at Shoreline Memorial Hospital where the teammates walked through the entire hospital and signed autographs for staff and patients. Henry is also credited in helping fundraise for The Dan Marino Foundation. Henry suffers from advanced symptoms of CTE. He resides in Atlantic City.

References

1950 births
Living people
Players of American football from Oakland, California
American football defensive backs
Missouri Tigers football players
Miami Dolphins players
New York Giants players